The 2013 Atlantic Coast Conference men's soccer season is the 27th season of men's varsity soccer in the conference. The season will mark the first for the incoming Notre Dame Fighting Irish, Pittsburgh Panthers and Syracuse Orange, as well as the last ACC season for Maryland, which is leaving for the Big Ten. The 2013 ACC Men's Soccer Tournament will run from November 12–17, with quarterfinals at campus sites followed by the semifinals and final at the Maryland SoccerPlex in Boyds, Maryland.

The defending regular season and tournament champions are the Maryland Terrapins.

Changes from 2012 

 Notre Dame, Syracuse and Pittsburgh are joining the conference

Season outlook

Teams

Stadiums and locations

Personnel

ACC Tournament 

The 2013 ACC Men's Soccer Tournament, as noted above, will have quarterfinals held at campus sites, with the semifinals and final at the Maryland SoccerPlex.

Results

Statistics

See also 

 Atlantic Coast Conference
 2013 ACC Men's Soccer Tournament
 2013 NCAA Division I men's soccer season
 2013 in American soccer

References 

 
2013 NCAA Division I men's soccer season